Thiomersal (INN), or thimerosal (USAN, JAN), is an organomercury compound. It is a well-established antiseptic and antifungal agent.

The pharmaceutical corporation Eli Lilly and Company gave thiomersal the trade name Merthiolate. It has been used as a preservative in vaccines, immunoglobulin preparations, skin test antigens, antivenins, ophthalmic and nasal products, and tattoo inks. In spite of the scientific consensus that fears about its safety are unsubstantiated, its use as a vaccine preservative has been called into question by anti-vaccination groups. Due to this public pressure the substance was phased out of routine childhood vaccines in the United States, the European Union, and a few other countries in response to popular fears. It remains in use as a preservative for annual flu vaccines.

History
Morris Kharasch, a chemist then at the University of Maryland filed a patent application for thiomersal in 1927; Eli Lilly later marketed the compound under the trade name Merthiolate. In vitro tests conducted by Lilly investigators H. M. Powell and W. A. Jamieson found that it was forty to fifty times as effective as phenol against Staphylococcus aureus. It was used to kill bacteria and prevent contamination in antiseptic ointments, creams, jellies, and sprays used by consumers and in hospitals, including nasal sprays, eye drops, contact lens solutions, immunoglobulins, and vaccines. Thiomersal was used as a preservative (bactericide) so that multidose vials of vaccines could be used instead of single-dose vials, which are more expensive. By 1938, Lilly's assistant director of research listed thiomersal as one of the five most important drugs ever developed by the company.

Structure
Thiomersal features mercury(II) with a coordination number 2, i.e. two ligands are attached to Hg, the thiolate and the ethyl group. The carboxylate group confers solubility in water. Like other two-coordinate Hg(II) compounds, the coordination geometry of Hg is linear, with a 180° S-Hg-C angle. Typically, organomercury thiolate compounds are prepared from organomercury chlorides.

Uses
Thiomersal's main use is as an antiseptic and antifungal agent, due to the oligodynamic effect. In multidose injectable drug delivery systems, it prevents serious adverse effects such as the Staphylococcus infection that, in one 1928 incident, killed 12 of 21 children vaccinated with a diphtheria vaccine that lacked a preservative. Unlike existing preservatives at the time, such as phenol and cresol, thiomersal does not reduce the potency of the vaccines that it protects. Bacteriostatics such as thiomersal are not needed in single-dose injectables.

In the United States, countries in the European Union, and a few other affluent countries, thiomersal is no longer used as a preservative in routine childhood vaccination schedules. In the U.S., the only exceptions among vaccines routinely recommended for children are some formulations of the inactivated influenza vaccine for children older than two years. Several vaccines that are not routinely recommended for young children do contain thiomersal, including DT (diphtheria and tetanus), Td (tetanus and diphtheria), and TT (tetanus toxoid); other vaccines may contain a trace of thiomersal from steps in manufacture. The multi-dose versions of the influenza vaccines Fluvirin and Fluzone can contain up to 25 micrograms of mercury per dose from thiomersal. Also, four rarely used treatments for pit viper, coral snake, and black widow venom still contain thiomersal. Outside North America and Europe, many vaccines contain thiomersal; the World Health Organization has concluded that there is no evidence of toxicity from thiomersal in vaccines and no reason on safety grounds to change to more expensive single-dose administration. The United Nations Environment Program backed away from an earlier proposal of putting thiomersal, when used as a component in vaccines, on the list of banned compounds, in its campaign to reduce exposure to mercury worldwide. Citing that eliminating the preservative in multi-dose vaccines, primarily used in developing countries, would lead to high cost and a requirement for refrigeration which the developing countries can ill afford, the UN's final decision at the Minamata Convention on Mercury in 2013 was to exclude thiomersal from the treaty.

Toxicology

General toxicity
Thiomersal is very toxic by inhalation, ingestion, and in contact with skin (EC hazard symbol T+), with a danger of cumulative effects. It is also very toxic to aquatic organisms and may cause long-term adverse effects in aquatic environments (EC hazard symbol N). In the body, it is metabolized or degraded to ethylmercury (C2H5Hg+) and thiosalicylate.

Cases have been reported of severe mercury poisoning by accidental exposure or attempted suicide, with some fatalities. Animal experiments suggest that thiomersal rapidly dissociates to release ethylmercury after injection; that the disposition patterns of mercury are similar to those after exposure to equivalent doses of ethylmercury chloride; and that the central nervous system and the kidneys are targets, with lack of motor coordination being a common sign. Similar signs and symptoms have been observed in accidental human poisonings. The mechanisms of toxic action are unknown.

Fecal excretion accounts for most of the elimination from the body. Ethylmercury clears from blood with a half-life of about 18 days in adults by breakdown into other chemicals, including inorganic mercury. Ethylmercury is eliminated from the brain in about 14 days in infant monkeys. Risk assessment for effects on the nervous system have been made by extrapolating from dose-response relationships for methylmercury. Methylmercury and ethylmercury distribute to all body tissues, crossing the blood–brain barrier and the placental barrier, and ethylmercury also moves freely throughout the body.

Concerns based on extrapolations from methylmercury caused thiomersal to be removed from U.S. childhood vaccines, starting in 1999. Since then, it has been found that ethylmercury is eliminated from the body and the brain significantly faster than methylmercury, so the late-1990s risk assessments turned out to be overly conservative. Though inorganic mercury metabolized from ethylmercury has a much longer half-life in the brain, at least 120 days, it appears to be much less toxic than the inorganic mercury produced from mercury vapor, for reasons not yet understood.

As an allergen

Thiomersal is used in patch testing for people who have dermatitis, conjunctivitis, and other potentially allergic reactions. A 2007 study in Norway found that 1.9% of adults had a positive patch test reaction to thiomersal; a higher prevalence of contact allergy (up to 6.6%) was observed in German populations. Thiomersal-sensitive individuals can receive intramuscular rather than subcutaneous immunization, though there have been no large sample sized studies regarding this matter to date. In real-world practice on vaccination of adult populations, contact allergy does not seem to elicit clinical reaction.

Thiomersal allergy has decreased in Denmark, probably because of its exclusion from vaccines there. In a recent study of Polish children and adolescents with chronic/recurrent eczema, positive reactions to thiomersal were found in 11.7% of children (7–8 y.o.) and 37.6% of adolescents (16–17 y.o.). This difference in the sensitization rates can be explained by changing exposure patterns: The adolescents have received six thiomersal-preserved vaccines during their life course, with the last immunization taking place 2–3 years before the mentioned study, younger children received only four thiomersal-preserved vaccines, with the last one applied five years before the study, while further immunizations were performed with new thiomersal-free vaccines.

Disproven autism hypothesis

Following a review of mercury-containing food and drugs mandated in 1999, the Centers for Disease Control and Prevention (CDC) and the American Academy of Pediatrics asked vaccine manufacturers to remove thiomersal from vaccines as a purely precautionary measure, and it was rapidly phased out of most U.S. and European vaccines. Many parents saw the action to remove thiomersal—in the setting of a perceived increasing rate of autism as well as increasing number of vaccines in the childhood vaccination schedule—as indicating that the preservative was the cause of autism. The scientific consensus is that there is no evidence supporting these claims, and the rate of autism continues to climb despite elimination of thiomersal from routine childhood vaccines. Major scientific and medical bodies such as the Institute of Medicine and World Health Organization, as well as governmental agencies such as the Food and Drug Administration and the CDC reject any role for thiomersal in autism or other neurodevelopmental disorders. This controversy has caused harm due to parents attempting to treat their autistic children with unproven and possibly dangerous treatments, discouraging parents from vaccinating their children due to fears about thiomersal toxicity, and diverting resources away from research into more promising areas for the cause of autism. Thousands of lawsuits have been filed in a U.S. federal court to seek damages from alleged toxicity from vaccines, including those purportedly caused by thiomersal.

See also
, a related antimicrobial
 Phenylmercuric nitrate - an organomercury compound with powerful antiseptic and antifungal effects

References

Thiolates
Eli Lilly and Company brands
Organomercury compounds
Excipients
Organic sodium salts
Benzoates